Dr Chew Chin Hin is the only doctor from Singapore who had been conferred the prestigious Mastership in the American College of Physicians (MACP) for contribution to medicine in Singapore.

Background
As a child, Dr Chew was born in Geylang Road, Singapore in 1931 and grew up in the doctors' quarters of Singapore General Hospital and Tan Tock Seng Hospital because his father, Dr Benjamin Chew, worked there. He practically grew up in hospitals. Witnessing the cruel effects of World War II and the widespread diseases with little medical supplies during that period, made him decide to become a doctor. He had his education at Victoria School and Anglo Chinese School (1937-1948). He graduated MBBS Hong Kong in 1955 and his specialist training was in Singapore, Edinburgh Cardiff, London (UK), Gothenburg Uppsala (Sweden), New York, and Denver (USA).

He excelled in sports in school and university such as chess, hockey, and cricket. He was in the Anglo Chinese School team of six which became the first post-war Singapore Chess Champions in 1949 and he captained the Hong Kong University's Hockey XI.

Dr. Chew was a senior physician and head of medicine at Tan Tock Seng Hospital from 1965-1979 and also the medical director. He delivered the first TTSH oration in 1997.

Dr. Chew served as the Deputy Director of Medical Services Ministry of Health from 1981 to 1991. He helped to break the stranglehold of tuberculosis (TB) in Singapore, as chairman of the Singapore Tuberculosis Research Committee with Singapore's collaboration with the British Medical Council for three decades, ending in 1991 (director Wallace Fox, TB section). Dr. Chew was the Foundation President of the Singapore Thoracic Society, later an Honorary Member. He was on several committees of the International Union against Tuberculosis serving as chairman of its scientific meetings. In 1986, he was appointed Honorary President of the World Congress on Tuberculosis and Lung disease held in Singapore. He led Singapore's delegation to the World Health Assembly (WHO) in Geneva and the regional assembly (WP Region, WHO) in Manila in the 1980s. He also initiated the Advance Medical Directive (AMD) or living will. He was a senior member of Singapore Medical Council for over twenty years, later he served on its Ethical Committee. He was Master of the Academy of Medicine, Singapore, 1973 to 1975. He was bestowed the Public Administration medal, Gold (PPA(E)in 1983 by the President of Singapore for services to Medicine, Medical Education, and Research.

In 1970 following the withdrawal of the British Military including the Royal Air Force, the certification of pilots was transferred to the Ministry of Health with Tan Tock Seng Hospital taking this responsibility. Prof Chew was the second chairman of Singapore's Civil Aviation Medical Board and advanced the discipline of Aviation Medicine. He was conferred the Honorary Live Membership of the Society of Aviation Medicine. He continues to be a Co-Chairman of the Board of Accessors.

He was conferred the prestigious Mastership in the American College of Physicians (MACP) on 22 April 2010 - the first and only Singaporean honoured. The Mastership has been given to fewer than 700 doctors worldwide since 1923. He is also a Fellow of the Royal Colleges of Physicians in the UK, and Australasia, Honorary fellow, Colleges of Physicians, Hong Kong and Singapore. In addition, he was conferred the honorary fellowship of the College of Family Physicians and delivered the Sreenivasan Oration. He was the first non- Australasian to receive the RACP College medal (https://www.racp.edu.au/about/college-roll/college-roll-bio/chew-chin-hin). He delivered the first Seah Cheng Siang Memorial Lecture in Singapore and the Gerald Choa Memorial Lecture in Hong Kong. He is the only Singaporean to be elected Foundation Fellow of the Association of Physicians of Great Britain and Ireland ( founded by Sir William Osler) in 2021, having been a Senior Member since 1991. 

He initiated the development of Singapore's post-graduate medical qualifications when Deputy Prime Minister Dr Toh Chin Chye criticized the medical faculty and the profession for being tardy in this. He with Master Academy of Medicine K Shanmugaratnam and the council met Dr Toh. Soon after with Master Shanmugaratnam, the School of Post Graduate Medical Studies was established and the first degrees of Master of Medicine (MMed) were awarded in 1970. On 23, August 2014, the Minister for Health Gan Kim Yong commended in tribute to medical pioneers: "Our pioneers also saw the importance in being well-skilled. They invested heavily in our best resource - our people. Training them to excel in their fields and to care for Singaporeans. Prof Chew Chin Hin knows this and has always been passionate about medical education. He recognized very early on, that Singapore could not depend on other countries to raise the standards of our specialized training. As Master of the Academy of Medicine, Prof Chew was instrumental in the development of local postgraduate qualifications. He was a man who demanded excellence and insisted that our qualifications be as robust as those in the UK and Australia. Even after retirement, Prof Chew continues to serve actively and contribute to the progress of graduate medical studies in Singapore. In fact, he is very proud to share with us that at 83 years old, he is only the second oldest faculty member! I am confident that our new generations of healthcare professionals will be infected by his dedication and will be more than ready for the future."  

After retirement from Civil Service in 1991, he became the adjunct Professor of Medicine and honorary advisor at the Division of Graduate Medical Studies National University of Singapore's Yong Loo Lin School of Medicine. He is also Emeritus Consultant, at Tan Tock Seng Hospital. An Honorary Member of the Singapore Medical Association, Professor Chew delivered the SMA Lecture in 1998 and the Gordon Arthur Ransome Oration during the Golden Anniversary of the Academy of Medicine in 2007. 

He is married to Dr. Anna Hui, his classmate while they were in Hong Kong Medical School and together they have four children and two grandchildren Caleb and Sarah Wee (children of Cheow Beng and Eirene Wee).

References

Staff Achievements - Tan Tock Seng Hospital
 Chang Ai-Lien (26 April 2010). "A will to heal". The Straits Times (Singapore).

Year of birth missing (living people)
Living people
20th-century Singaporean physicians
Victoria School, Singapore alumni
Anglo-Chinese School alumni
Singaporean healthcare managers
Singaporean people of Chinese descent